Five ships of the Royal Navy have borne the name HMS Argo, after the Argo, the ship of Jason and the Argonauts:

  was a 28-gun sixth rate frigate launched in 1758 and broken up by 1776.
  was a schooner purchased in 1780 and sold in 1783.
  was a 44-gun fifth rate launched in 1781. She was sold in 1816.
She was converted to harbour service in 1826, was renamed HMS Argo in 1833 and was broken up in 1860.
She was used as a boom defence vessel from 1899 and was renamed HMS Argo in 1904. She was sold in 1921.

Royal Navy ship names